Wild and Woolly is a 1917 American silent Western comedy film which tells the story of one man's personal odyssey from cowboy-obsessed Easterner to Western tough guy. It stars Douglas Fairbanks, Eileen Percy, Walter Bytell and Sam De Grasse. The film was adapted by Anita Loos from a story by Horace B. Carpenter and was directed by John Emerson.

Plot

As described in a film magazine review, Jeff Hillington (Fairbanks), son of railroad magnate Collis J. Hillington (Bytell), tires of the East and longs for the wild and woolly West. He has his apartment and office fixed up in his understanding of the accepted Western style, which he has gleaned from dime novels. A delegation from Bitter Creek comes to New York City seeking financial backing for the construction of a spur line, and go to Collis to explain their proposition. Collis sends Jeff to investigate. The citizens of Bitter Creek, Arizona, realizing that a favorable report from Jeff is necessary, decide to live up to Jeff's idea of a Western town. They set up a program with a wild reception for Jeff, a barroom dance, and a train holdup. Steve Shelby (De Grasse), a grafting Indian agent, knowing that he is about to be caught by the government, decides to do "one more trick" and enters into the plan to rob the train, turning it into a real scheme. Events turn earnest and Shelby kidnaps Nell Larabee (Percy), with whom Jeff has fallen in love. The entire crowd has been trapped in the dance hall, which is surrounded by Indians, and Jeff's revolver loaded with blanks. When the situation is finally explained to Jeff, by superhuman efforts (and typical Fairbanks surprises) he rounds up the Indians, rescues the girl, completely foils the scheme of Steve, and becomes the hero of the hour, getting to marry Nell.

Cast
 Douglas Fairbanks as Jeff Hillington
 Eileen Percy as Nell Larabee
 Walter Bytell as Collis J. Hillington
 Joseph Singleton as Judson, the Butler
 Calvert Carter as Tom Larabee, the Hotel Keeper
 Forrest Seabury as Banker                                                                                                   
 J. W. Jones as Lawyer
 Charles Stevens as Pedro
 Sam De Grasse as Steve Shelby, the Indian Agent
 Tom Wilson as Casey the Engineer
 Ruth Allen
 Edward Burns
 Wharton James

Production

Wild and Woolly was filmed in Manhattan and the Paragon Studio in Fort Lee, New Jersey, where  many early film studios in America's first motion picture industry were based at the beginning of the 20th century.  The scenes of the Arizona town were shot over a week's time in Burbank, California. Joseph Henabery served as an assistant to director John Emerson.

Reception
Like many American films of the time, Wild and Woolly was subject to cuts by city and state film censorship boards. The Chicago Board of Censors required cuts of the intertitle "Say, that's a chance for us to clean up big," all scenes of the Indian Agent and Indians with a basket containing flasks of liquor, the three intertitles "Whoop it up and all you capture is yours," You watch every door of the hotel and after I get the girl you kill," and "They can't hurt you, their guns are loaded with fake bullets," scene where Fairbanks is shot, an Indian shoots a man, four scenes of Indians falling after being shot, and the shooting of the express messenger, taking his keys, and the rifling of the express box.

Fairbanks biographer Jeffrey Vance, writing in 2008, believes Wild and Woolly "is the finest of the surviving Fairbanks-Emerson-Loos collaborations and perhaps the best of the thirteen films he made for Artcraft. It was also one of Fairbanks's personal favorites."

Preservation status
Copies of Wild and Woolly are preserved in several film collections and archives, and it has been released on DVD. In 2002, this film was deemed "culturally, historically, or aesthetically significant" by the United States Library of Congress and selected for preservation in the National Film Registry.

References

External links 

 Wild and Woolly essay  by Steve Massa at National Film Registry
 Wild and Woolly essay by Daniel Eagan in America's Film Legacy: The Authoritative Guide to the Landmark Movies in the National Film Registry, A&C Black, 2010 , pages 60 & 61 
 
 

1917 films
1917 comedy films
1910s Western (genre) comedy films
American black-and-white films
Censored films
Films directed by John Emerson
Films set in Arizona
Films set in New York City
Films shot in Fort Lee, New Jersey
Films shot in New York City
Films with screenplays by Anita Loos
Paramount Pictures films
Silent American Western (genre) comedy films
United States National Film Registry films
1910s American films
1910s English-language films